Blaine Township is a township in Clay County, Kansas, USA.  As of the 2000 census, its population was 259.

Geography
According to the USGS, it contains two cemeteries: Republican City and Wilson.

The streams of Chestnut Branch, Huntress Creek, North Branch Five Creek, Otter Creek and Reeder Branch Five Creek run through this township.

References
 USGS Geographic Names Information System (GNIS)

External links
 US-Counties.com
 City-Data.com

Townships in Clay County, Kansas
Townships in Kansas